Acrophiletis is a genus of moth in the family Gelechiidae. It contains the species Acrophiletis cosmocrossa, which is found in Bolivia.

References

Anacampsinae
Monotypic moth genera
Moths of South America